Harold Fleming Snead (June 16, 1903 – December 23, 1987) was an American agricultural supply store owner and justice of the Supreme Court of Appeals of Virginia.

He received his higher education at the University of Richmond, obtaining a Bachelor of Arts degree in 1925 and an LL. B. from T. C. Williams Law School at the University of Richmond in 1929.  From 1935 to 1948, he was trial judge in Henrico County and, in 1948, was appointed judge of the Tenth Judicial Circuit.  Judge Snead remained at the circuit court until he was elected to the Supreme Court of Appeals of Virginia on January 14, 1957.  With the retirement of Chief Justice Eggleston and Justice Buchanan on September 30, 1969, Justice Snead became Chief Justice, being the first native Richmonder ever to fill that position.  Justice Snead served on the Supreme Court until he retired on September 30, 1974.  He was a member of Omicron Delta Kappa and Delta Theta Phi. He died in Richmond in December 1987.

Virginia lawyers
Chief Justices of the Supreme Court of Virginia
1903 births
1987 deaths
20th-century American lawyers
20th-century American judges
Virginia circuit court judges